Ariful Islam (born 20 December 1996) is a Bangladeshi cricketer. He made his List A debut for Khelaghar Samaj Kallyan Samity in the 2016–17 Dhaka Premier Division Cricket League on 12 April 2017. Prior to his List A debut, he was named in Bangladesh's squad for the 2016 Under-19 Cricket World Cup. In September 2022, he got an opportunity to play in Pakistan Junior League for the team Gujranwala Giants.

References

External links
 

1996 births
Living people
Bangladeshi cricketers
Khelaghar Samaj Kallyan Samity cricketers
Place of birth missing (living people)